The Silver Appleyard is a British breed of domestic duck. It was bred in the first half of the twentieth century by Reginald Appleyard, with the aim of creating a dual-purpose breed that would provide both a good quantity of meat and plenty of eggs.

History 

The Silver Appleyard was bred in the 1930s at Priory Waterfowl Farm near Ixworth, in Suffolk, by Reginald Appleyard, an expert poultry breeder who also created the Ixworth breed of chicken. His aim in creating the breed is described in a leaflet he put out after the end of the Second World War: to create white-skinned duck with a wide, deep breast, which would also be beautiful to look at and would lay abundant white eggs. By the time the pamphlet was issued, his birds had won prizes at the Dairy Show in London and at Bethnal Green. In 1947 a pair of Silver Appleyards was painted by the animal painter Ernest George Wippell. Appleyard worked on the development and stabilisation of the breed until his death in 1964, but never produced a standard. When the Silver Appleyard standard was drawn up in 1982, it was based on Wippell's painting.

Some birds were taken to the United States in the 1960s. The breed was added to the Standard of Perfection of the American Poultry Association in 2000. It is listed as "threatened" by the Livestock Conservancy.

There are two small-size versions of the Silver Appleyard. A Silver Appleyard Bantam was bred by Reginald Appleyard in the 1940s by cross-breeding Khaki Campbell ducks and Call drakes; it thus did not have the same genetic origin as the large bird. A Miniature Silver Appleyard, created by Tom Bartlett of Folly Farm, was recognised in 1997; it is about a third of the size of the large bird, and so is not small enough to be termed a bantam. Appleyard's bantam version was renamed, and is now the Silver Bantam.

Characteristics 

The Silver Appleyard is a "large, sturdily built duck" with a "blocky" physique and a prominent breast.  When full grown it weighs between six and eight pounds.

Drakes of this breed have a yellow or greenish-coloured bill which sometimes takes on a striated appearance when the duck is older.  The drake has a chestnut red breast, flank, sides, and shoulders with white "frosting and lacing" and a "creamy or silvery white" underside.  Drakes' wings are grey and white with a cross-stripe of bright blue.  Their tail feathers are a dark bronze colour.  Feet and legs are orange.

The Silver Appleyard hen has a yellow or orange bill with a black "bean".  Plumage is whitish with markings in various shades of brown and grey.  Her legs are yellow or orange with dark toenails and she, like the drake, also has wings marked with a blue cross-stripe.

The British Waterfowl Standards book lists criteria for an ideal example of this breed including (but not limited to) criteria such as:
A well-rounded head feathered in iridescent green over brown black
A slightly erect, alert and busy carriage
A rump which is brown black with a slight iridescence, laced with white
Legs that are set slightly back and well apart
A medium length bill that is not wedge-shaped and that rises in a gentle curve to the brow
Dark brown eyes

Use 

The Silver Appleyard was created as a dual-purpose breed, reared both for meat and for eggs. They are also kept for showing.

References 

Duck breeds
Duck breeds originating in the United Kingdom
Animal breeds on the RBST Watchlist